The seven necessities stem from the phrase "Firewood, rice, oil, salt, sauce, vinegar and tea are the seven necessities to begin a day". The items were known as early as the Song dynasty travel book, Dreams of the Former Capital.

The Chinese phrase "seven necessities" literally means "開 open 門 door 七 seven 件事 items" when translated, which is an old Chinese saying. They include  firewood (柴 chái), rice (米 mĭ), oil (油 yóu), salt (鹽 yán), sauce (醬 jiàng), vinegar (醋 cù), tea (茶 chá). The seven necessities were made popular in modern tea culture due to the fact the beverage was mentioned as one of the seven necessities of Chinese life.

References

External links 
Chinese Culture Institute 
 

Chinese tea culture
Chinese proverbs